Khandokar Mahbub Uddin Ahmad (1925-2014) was a Bangladeshi politician and the former Member of Parliament from Dhaka-9.

Birth and early life 
Khandokar Mahbub Uddin Ahmad was born in the house of late Khandokar Shams Uddin Ahmed in Gopalganj District on 7 December 1925.

Career
Ahmad was elected to Parliament from Dhaka-9 as a Bangladesh Nationalist Party candidate in 2001 and served till 2006. He was a Member of the Bangladesh Nationalist Party Standing Committee till 2008. He served two terms as the President of Supreme Court Bar Association.

Death
Ahmad died on 1 March 2014 in United Hospital, Dhaka. He was buried at Azimpur Graveyard.

References

1925 births
2014 deaths
People from Gopalganj District, Bangladesh
Bangladesh Nationalist Party politicians
6th Jatiya Sangsad members
8th Jatiya Sangsad members